Faouzi Yaya (born September 21, 1989) is an Algerian footballer who plays for NA Hussein Dey in the Algerian Ligue Professionnelle 1.

Club career
Yaya starred for Algerian side MO Béjaïa in two spells (from 2010 to 2012 and again from 2013 to 2017), helping the club reach the final of the 2016 CAF Confederation Cup. In 2012, he joined rivals ES Sétif, where he would play for manager Hubert Velud. Yaya captained MO Béjaïa during his second spell at the club, a key member of the team that narrowly missed out on the 2014–15 Algerian Ligue Professionnelle 1 title. In the 2016 CAF Confederation Cup final, MO Béjaïa faced TP Mazembe, then managed by Velud. Yaya scored MO Béjaïa's only goal in the first leg, while TP Mazembe secured a 4–1 victory in the second leg to win the tie. In 2017, he decided to join USMA.

References

External links

1989 births
Algerian Ligue Professionnelle 1 players
Algerian Ligue 2 players
Algerian footballers
ES Sétif players
NA Hussein Dey players
MO Béjaïa players
Living people
Kabyle people
People from Sidi-Aïch
USM Alger players
Association football midfielders
21st-century Algerian people